Zoe Blanc (born 10 January 1988) is a French former competitive ice dancer. With Pierre-Loup Bouquet, she is a three-time French national medalist and placed 14th at the 2010 European Championships. They retired from competition in 2011.

Programs 
(with Bouquet)

Results 
(with Bouquet)

References

External links 

 

French female ice dancers
Living people
1988 births
Sportspeople from Grenoble
Competitors at the 2009 Winter Universiade
Competitors at the 2011 Winter Universiade